Veinticinco de agosto, 1983 (August the 25th, 1983) is a chamber opera by Juan María Solare, to a Spanish libretto by Javier Adúriz based on the life by Jorge Luis Borges. Solare composed the opera from 1992 to 1993.

The opera is approximately 37.5 minutes in length and consists of one act with fifteen scenes.

Characters
Old Borges (bass)
Young Borges (tenor)
Speaker (baritone or tenor)
Owner of the hotel (baritone or bass)
Chorus

Orchestra 
Flute
Tenor Saxophone
String Quartet
Piano
Percussion (Suspended cymbal, 2 anvils, glockenspiel, vibraphone, 5 temple blocks, 3 tomtoms, tenor drum)

Operas by Juan Maria Solare
Spanish-language operas
Chamber operas
One-act operas
1993 operas
Operas
Compositions by Juan María Solare
Operas about writers
Fiction set in 1983
Operas set in the 20th century
Operas set in Argentina
Jorge Luis Borges
Cultural depictions of Argentine men
Cultural depictions of writers
Cultural depictions of poets